{|
{{Infobox ship image
|Ship image=[[File:USC&GS Oceanographer (OSS O1) off Seattle c1974.jpg|300px|NOAAS Oceanographer (R 101)]]
|Ship caption=NOAAS Oceanographer (R 101) off Seattle, Washington
}}

|}

NOAAS Oceanographer (R 101), originally USC&GS Oceanographer (OSS O1), was an American Oceanographer-class oceanographic research vessel in service in the United States Coast and Geodetic Survey from 1966 to 1970 and in the National Oceanic and Atmospheric Administration (NOAA) from 1970 to 1996. She served as flagship of both the Coast and Geodetic Survey and NOAA fleets.

Construction
Designed by the U.S. Maritime Administration (MARAD), Oceanographer was laid down on 22 July 1963 by Gibbs Shipyards at Jacksonville, Florida, under contract to Aerojet General Shipyards and launched on 18 April 1964. Her stark white paint, large radome aft of the funnels, and heavy crane on the aft deck gave her a distinctive appearance. She had chemistry, wet and dry oceanographic, meteorological, gravimetric, and photographic laboratories. She also had several precision oceanographic winches.

Operational career
USC&GS Oceanographer (OSS 01) was commissioned as an "ocean survey ship" (OSS) with the U.S. Coast and Geodetic Survey at the Washington Navy Yard in Washington, D.C., on 13 July 1966 under the command of Captain Arthur L. Wardwell, USESSA. With her home port at Seattle, Washington, she was the second Coast and Geodetic Survey ship of the name, and served as flagship of the Survey's fleet. When the Coast and Geodetic Survey and other United States Government agencies combined to form NOAA on 3 October 1970, she became the research ship NOAAS Oceanographer (R 101), the first NOAA ship to bear the name, as well as flagship of the NOAA fleet.

In 1967 she departed Jacksonville on 31 March on a "world science and ambassadorial cruise" which took her from the United States East Coast to the United States West Coast via the North Atlantic Ocean, Mediterranean Sea, Red Sea, Indian Ocean, and Pacific Ocean, making many good-will stops along the way before concluding the voyage by arriving at Seattle on 11 December. In 1968, she supported Project Sea Use, a multi-party expedition to Cobb Seamount in the North Pacific Ocean which developed much of the initial scientific understanding of the seamount. In 1969 she completed the circumnavigation of the globe she began in March 1967 when she returned to the U.S. East Coast.

Other highlights of Oceanographers career included participation in the first large-scale, coordinated international sea-air interaction survey, known as the BOMEX Study, in 1969, and environmental base-line studies on deep-ocean mining (DOMES). In 1980, Oceanographer became the first U.S. Government vessel allowed into a port of the People's Republic of China.Oceanographer was placed in reserve in July 1981. She underwent a major refit in which she received an Alden weatherfax, a Sperry Mark 37 gyro, a Raytheon X-band Pathfinder radar, Inmarsat, an MX1102 Global Positioning System, a new salinometer, a Shipboard Environmental Acquisition System with expendable bathythermograph gear, a new meteorological station, and a Doppler current profiling system, and returned to service with this new equipment on 8 April 1986. Placed in reserve in 1989, she later returned to service again.

Final dispositionOceanographer and NOAA Ships Discoverer (R 102) and Malcolm Baldridge (R 103), ex-Researcher, were replaced by NOAAS Ronald H. Brown (R 104) under the NOAA Fleet Modernization Program in the 1990s.  After being decommissioned in 1996, Oceanographer was sold to the Kirkland Yacht Club Marina of Kirkland Washington, to act as a breakwater and was renamed M/V Protector. Protector was tied up at the marina from 1997 to 2005.

In August 2005, Protector was renamed M/V Sahara and towed to a Seattle, Washington, shipyard to be refitted as a luxury cruise ship. In 2010, Lia Hawkins died while working on the conversion. Courts awarded $3.45 million to Hawkins's estate. The ship's owner, G Shipping Ltd., a Malta-based company controlled by Italian race-car driver and hotelier Emanuele Garosci appears to have had the ship claimed by the courts in lieu of payment. As of 2016, the conversion project had been canceled and the ship was for sale for US$1,200,000.

The ship was broken up in Mexico in 2019.

See also
 NOAA ships and aircraft

References

 Prézelin, Bernard, and A. D. Baker III, eds. The Naval Institute Guide to Combat Fleets of the World 1990/1991: Their Ships, Aircraft, and Armament''. Annapolis, Maryland: United States Naval Institute, 1990. .

Ships of the National Oceanic and Atmospheric Administration
Research vessels of the United States
Oceanographer-class oceanographic research ships
Ships built in Jacksonville, Florida
1964 ships